The following radio stations broadcast on AM frequency 1020 kHz: 1020 AM is a clear-channel U.S. frequency. KDKA Pittsburgh and KVNT Eagle River, Alaska, share Class A status of 1020 AM.

In Argentina 
 LRA58 in Rio Mayo, Chubut
 LRJ214 in San Juan
 LT10 in Santa Fe

In Mexico 
 XEPR-AM in Poza Rica, Veracruz
 XEWO-AM in Chetumal, Quintana Roo

In the United States 
Stations in bold are clear-channel stations.

References

Lists of radio stations by frequency